Antti Aalto (born 2 April 1995) is a Finnish ski jumper. He competed in two events at the 2018 Winter Olympics. His best ever result in a World Cup competition is 7th which he reached in Wisła 2018.

Ski jumping career
Aalto was 7th in the Qualification at the season opener in Wisla. He finished 9th together with the Finnish team in the team competition. On the following day, Aalto was sitting in 5th place after the first round. He lost two positions in the final round, meaning he finished 7th, which was his best ever World Cup result.

World Cup

Standings

Individual starts (88)

References

External links
 Antti Aalto  at Beijing 2022
 

1995 births
Living people
Finnish male ski jumpers
Olympic ski jumpers of Finland
Ski jumpers at the 2018 Winter Olympics
Ski jumpers at the 2022 Winter Olympics
People from Kitee
Sportspeople from North Karelia